The Top of the World Windpower Project is a 200 megawatt wind farm located near Casper, Wyoming, USA. The Top of the World Windpower Project began operation in 2010.

The U.S. Department of Justice brought charges against the operators concerning the deaths of 14 eagles and other migratory birds at the facility between 2010 and 2013. A settlement agreement was reached with Duke Energy paying federal fines and restitution amounting to $1 million.

See also

 Wind power in the United States
 List of onshore wind farms

References

External links

Buildings and structures in Converse County, Wyoming
Wind farms in Wyoming